Cora Tausz Rónai (born 31 July 1953) is a Brazilian writer, journalist and photographer.

Biography 
Cora Rónai was born in Rio de Janeiro, daughter of Hungarian-born writer Paulo Rónai and architect and swimmer Nora Tausz Rónai. She started her career as a journalist in Brasília, working for Jornal de Brasília, Correio Braziliense and as correspondent for Folha de S.Paulo and Jornal do Brasil in the Brazilian capital.

In 1980 she returned to Rio de Janeiro. In 1982 she left Jornal do Brasil, where she would return to later, to focus on writing for theater and children's literature.

An early adopter of computers, Rónai wrote the first column about personal computing in a Brazilian newspaper in 1987, in Jornal do Brasil. She also was the first Brazilian journalist to have a blog, internETC.

In 2006, she published the book Fala Foto, made entirely of photographs taken with cellphones. It was shortlisted for Prêmio Jabuti.

Rónai writes for O Globo since 1991, where she wrote the "Info etc". section until 2008. Currently she writes in the "Tecnologia" section, and also in "Segundo Caderno" (O Globo's arts and culture section). She is also an animals' rights activist.

Awards 
She was awarded the Prêmio Comunique-se Best Technology Writer in  2004, 2006 and 2008.

Books published 

Álbum de Retratos: Walter Firmo (Mauad)
Uma Ilha lá Longe (Record)
Caiu na Rede (Agir)
Fala Foto (Senac Rio)
Um História de Videogame (Record)
Há milhões de Anos Atrás (Globo)
Cabeça Feita Pé Quebrado (Globo)
A Princesa e a Abóbora (Globo)
Sapomorfose (Salamandra)
Idéias: um Livro de Entrevistas (UnB)
O Barbeiro de Sevilha e as Bodas de Fígaro (Ediouro) com Paulo Rónai
O Terceiro Tigre (Nova Fronteira)

Personal life 
Rónai lived with writer Millôr Fernandes until his death in 2012.

References

External links 
 Official blog
 Cora Rónai on Twitter
 Caderno Info&Etc Cora Rónai: Arqueologia Emocional. O Globo
 Colunas Cora Rónai  O Globo
 Colunas Cora Rónai  O Globo blogs
 Roda Viva com Millôr. Veja
 Cora Rónai no programa Altas Horas.
 Cora Rónai no programa Encontro com Fatima Bernardes

Brazilian environmentalists
Brazilian women environmentalists
Brazilian children's writers
Brazilian women children's writers
Brazilian journalists
Brazilian women journalists
Brazilian columnists
Writers from Rio de Janeiro (city)
Brazilian photographers
Brazilian women photographers
1953 births
Living people
20th-century Brazilian women writers
20th-century Brazilian writers
21st-century Brazilian women writers
21st-century Brazilian writers
Brazilian women columnists